Clube da Esquina is a 1972 double album by the Brazilian music artists collective Clube da Esquina, credited to Milton Nascimento and Lô Borges. 
Considered an important record in the history of Brazilian music, it features arrangements by Eumir Deodato and Wagner Tiso, and conductions by Paulo Moura. The album garnered attention for its engaged compositions and miscellany of sounds.

Despite popular belief, the photo on the album cover does not depict Borges and Nascimento as children. It was taken by a member of the collective, Brazilian photographer Cafi (Carlos da Silva Assunção Filho), on the side of a road in the rural northern Rio de Janeiro state. Due to increased public interest in the album's 40th anniversary, a search for the two boys was conducted, successfully identifying them as Antonio Rimes and Antônio Carlos Rosa de Oliveira.

Legacy and critical reception

The LP was considered in the list of the Brazilian version of Rolling Stone as the 7th best Brazilian album of all time. Spin ranked the album at number 19 in its list for the 50 Best Albums of 1972. In professional reviews, Clube da Esquina follows as one of the most marking albums in Milton Nascimento's and Lo Borges' career, as well to Brazilian Popular Music (known there as MPB).

At the time of the album's release the critical response was not uniformly positive. Márcio Borges stated "Naturally, the critics were terrible. They wanted to compare Bituca (Milton) with Caetano Veloso and Chico Buarque, they didn't understand a bit of the inter-racial, international, interplanetary ecumenism proposed by the atemporal dissonances from Bituca. They despised the findings of Chopin and the beatlemaniac love from little Lo."

Track listing

References

1972 albums
Milton Nascimento albums
Albums arranged by Eumir Deodato
Portuguese-language albums